Talara Basin is a depression filled with sedimentary rock, that is a sedimentary basin, in northwestern Peru. On wider scale Talara Basin is located within rocks of an older and larger sedimentary basin that developed in the Mesozoic and Paleozoic. Talara Basin contains various minor oil and gas fields. The oil and gas reservoirs of the formation are trapped structural and stratigraphical features. The source rock of the oil and gas is thought to be marine shales of Cenozoic age but some may come from similar shales but of Cretaceous age. Oil has been extracted from its onshore field since the mid-1800s. The basin covers an area of no less than 15,000 km2.

References

External links
Talara basin in SEG Wiki

Sedimentary basins of Peru
Forearc basins
Cretaceous Peru
Paleogene Peru
Neogene Peru
Paleontology in Peru
Basins
Basins
Oil fields of Peru